The MV Cristina A is a Turkish flagged container ship owned by the Turkey based Limar Liman ve Gemi Isletmeleri A.S. and operated by the Delmas Shipping Co. in Le Havre, France. The vessel has a capacity of 1,604 nominal teus or 1,174 teus 14TH. She has been in service since June 8, 2008 on the route between Europe and West Africa. She is the 18th vessel in the fleet of Arkas Shipping & Transport Co. with the company having 23 container ships in total as of October 2008.  The shipping line is ultimately operated by CMA CGM through its subsidiary OTAL.

In 2019 the ship was renamed Vento di Maestrale, and brought under the Malta flag, homeport Valletta. She is still in management of Arkas Shipping.

References 

Ships of CMA CGM
Merchant ships of Turkey
Container ships
Ships built in Wolgast
2007 ships